Rocky Dundas (born January 30, 1967) is a Canadian former professional ice hockey right winger. He played 5 games in the National Hockey League for the Toronto Maple Leafs during the 1989–90 season. The rest of his career, which lasted from 1987 to 1990, was spent in the American Hockey League.

Hockey career
Dundas was born in Regina, Saskatchewan. He spent four full seasons in the Western Hockey League with three different teams. His top junior season was his third, with the Spokane Chiefs, when he scored 31 goals and 101 points. The trade to his third junior team, the Medicine Hat Tigers, was his most rewarding, as a result of a Memorial Cup championship at season's end. The Montreal Canadiens selected Dundas in the 1985 entry Draft, and he soon found himself playing in their system with the American Hockey League's Sherbrooke Canadiens.

Unable to crack the Canadiens roster during his tenure, Dundas left the organization and signed with the Toronto Maple Leafs as a free agent on October 4, 1989. Though most of his season was spent with their NHL affiliate in Newmarket, Dundas got to play at the NHL level with Toronto, suiting up for games during the 1989-90 season. Dundas recorded one point, but registered 25 penalty minutes.

Dundas left professional hockey after the 1989–90 season to become a full-time pastor.

Pastoral Work
Dundas worked as a youth pastor at Bayview Glen Church. Dundas went on to become the co-lead pastor at Summit Community Church in Richmond Hill, Ontario.

Career statistics

Regular season and playoffs

References

External links
 
 Game Focus Gear Rocky Dundas's sports apparel website

1967 births
Living people
Baltimore Skipjacks players
Canadian ice hockey right wingers
Ice hockey people from Saskatchewan
Kelowna Wings players
Medicine Hat Tigers players
Montreal Canadiens draft picks
Newmarket Saints players
Regina Blues players
Regina Pats players
Sherbrooke Canadiens players
Spokane Chiefs players
Sportspeople from Regina, Saskatchewan
Toronto Maple Leafs players